HMCS Wolf was an armed yacht of the Royal Canadian Navy during World War II that saw service on the British Columbia Coast of Canada. Constructed in 1915 as the yacht Wenowah, with the US entry into World War I, the vessel was taken into United States Navy service as USS Wenonah (SP-165) as a patrol ship. The vessel escorted convoys between the United States and Europe and between Gibraltar and Bizerte, Tunis and Genoa, Italy. After the war, Wenonah was loaned to the United States Coast and Geodetic Survey for three and a half years before being sold to private interests in 1928. In private ownership, the vessel was renamed at least twice, including Stranger and Blue Water.

With the onset of World War II, the Royal Canadian Navy sought vessels capable of patrol duties. However, a lack of Canadian ships led them to acquiring vessels from their southern neighbour. Blue Water was acquired in 1940 for service on the British Columbia coast and used a patrol vessel. Following the war, the ship was sold again to commercial ownership and renamed Gulfstream. Gulfstream was wrecked off Powell River, British Columbia on 11 October 1947.

Description
In United States Navy service the ship had a complement of 65 personnel and was armed with two 3"/50 caliber guns.

Wolf had a complement of 5 officers and 38 ratings.

Service history

As Wenonah
Wenonah was a yacht constructed in 1915 by George Lawley & Sons at their yard in Neponset, Massachusetts. With the US entry into World War I, the United States Navy (USN) sought out ships to augment its patrol service and acquired Wenonah from Walter G. Ladd. Wenonah was taken up as a patrol ship by the USN on 8 June 1917 and given the hull identification number SP-165. The vessel was commissioned on 22 October.

Wenonah departed Newport, Rhode Island with five other patrol ships and a tender, towing submarine chasers to Gibraltar via Bermuda and the Azores. The convoy arrived on 25 December and beginning on 15 January 1918 Wenonah was used to escort convoys between Gibraltar and Bizerte, Tunisia. In July, Wenonah escorted a convoy to Genoa, Italy. During this mission, one of the vessels she was escorting,  was torpedoed on 23 July. Wenonah recovered the survivors after dropping one depth charge on a suspected contact. The following day, 24 July,  was torpedoed. Once again Wenonah dropped a depth charge, but this time it failed to detonate and the patrol ship turned to rescue work, recovering 38 of Rutherglens crew. During the rest of the convoy's voyage Wenonah dropped several more depth charges and fired a 3-inch shell at suspected contacts, but no further engagement with the enemy was had before the end of the journey. Wenonah returned to Gibraltar–Bizerte convoys until the end of the war in November.

Wenowah returned to the US in December 1918 and remained in naval service until 12 April 1919. The vessel was then transferred to the Department of Commerce's Coast and Geodetic Survey and given the hull number PY-11. Wenonah spent three and a half years with the unit before transferring back to the USN in October 1922, joining the 13th Naval District on the West Coast and reclassified as a converted yacht. Wenonah remained in USN service from November 1922 to June 1928 when the yacht was stricken from the Navy List. The vessel was sold on 15 May 1929 to H. W. Goodall of Santa Barbara, California for $7,000 and renamed Stranger. Goodall sold Stranger to Mrs. Marian Huntington of San Francisco during the Great Depression.

As Wolf
To augment the local sea defences of coastal ports, the Royal Canadian Navy (RCN) sought large, steel-hulled yachts to requisition. However, a significant lack of capable vessels were owned by Canadians. Canada turned to its southern neighbour for suitable ships, finding several that met the navy's requirements. However, US neutrality laws prevented their sale to belligerents in the war. In order to circumvent these laws, the RCN requisitioned the yachts of prominent Canadian yachtsmen and then sent them to the US to purchase the yachts that had been identified by the navy without the US government knowing they were working for the navy. The money to acquire the vessels was provided by the Canadian government through bank loans.

While acquiring the yacht Breezin Thru for Clarence Wallace, Irving Keenleyside, an executive with the Burrard Dry Dock Company, spotted another yacht that fit the RCN's requirements. The yacht, Blue Water, was deemed acceptable after an investigation and Keenleyside sought the government's permission to purchase the vessel. He gave the name of his partner, E. A. Riddell, who was unaware of the program at the time of the call. The RCN then requisitioned Riddell's yacht upon approval in order to keep the real source of the funds secret.

Conversion to an armed yacht involved removing most of the luxurious finery and installing naval hardware. The ship was armed with a 12-pounder gun, depth charges and machine guns. The ship was later given a 1-inch anti-aircraft gun for training purposes. The ship was commissioned into the RCN on 2 October 1940. Wolf was used to patrol the Strait of Juan de Fuca and the mouth of the Fraser River after entering service. The ship remained with the Esquimalt Force for the entire war, though as the war progressed, Wolf was used for training and then after September 1943, as an examination vessel. The yacht was paid off on 16 May 1945 and by August the ship was laid up for sale.

The ship was purchased by Gulf Lines as a coastal ferry in 1946. Renamed Gulfstream the ferry was wrecked off Powell River, British Columbia on 11 October 1947.

Notes

Citations

References

External links

 
 NavSource Online: USS Wenonah (PY 11) - ex-USC&GS Wenonah - ex-USS Wenonah (SP 165)

Armed yachts of the Royal Canadian Navy
World War I patrol vessels of the United States
Ships built in Boston
Steam yachts
1915 ships